Looking for Alexander is a Canadian drama film. It was directed and written by Francis Leclerc. Marcel Beaulieu also wrote the script.

Plot summary
Thought to be clinically dead, Alexander (Roy Dupuis) suddenly awakes from a long coma. He recognizes nobody and remembers nothing. As Alexander tries to piece together his life, the mystery deepens. Director Francis Leclerc holds together this precious tale with poetic imagery and strong visuals, all the while teasing the viewer to discover the truth.

Awards  
 Genie Awards for Director, Screenplay, Actor (Roy Dupuis)
 Prix Jutra for Film, Director, Actor (Roy Dupuis), Editing

Cast 
 Roy Dupuis as Alexandre Tourneur
 Guy Thauvette as Joseph
 Line Rodier as Jeune infirmière
 Maka Kotto as Docteur Ba Kobhio
 Nathalie Coupal as Michelle Tourneur
 Stéphane Archambault as François
 Martin Héroux as Détective Jobin
 Johanne-Marie Tremblay as Infirmière
 Karine Lagueux as Sylvaine Tourneur
 Robert Lalonde as Agent Drolet
 Rosa Zacharie as Pauline Maksoud
 Francis Martineau as Physiothérapeute
 Maxime Dumontier as Joseph jeune
 Alexandre Harvey-Cormier as Alexandre jeune
 Jean-François Gaudet  as Père Noël
 France Parent as Brigitte, serveuse bar salon

References

External links

2004 drama films
2000s French-language films
2004 films
Canadian drama films
Films directed by Francis Leclerc
Best Film Prix Iris winners
French-language Canadian films
2000s Canadian films